Marvin John Schwartz (January 10, 1928 – September 3, 1997) was an American film producer and publicist. He began producing by optioning the novel Blindfold, which became a 1966 film.

Schwartz was born in the Bronx, New York, to Sol Schwartz and Minnie Siegel, Yiddish-speaking Jewish emigrants from Russia and Austria, respectively. His father worked in the garment industry cutting furs. He died in Boulder Creek, California.

In Quentin Tarantino's Once Upon a Time in Hollywood (2019), Al Pacino plays a character with a similar name, Marvin Schwarz, who is Rick Dalton’s talent agent.

Select credits
Blindfold (1966)
The War Wagon (1967)
100 Rifles (1969)
Hard Contract (1969)
Tribes (1970)
Welcome Home, Soldier Boys (1971)
Kid Blue (1973)

References

External links

American film producers
1928 births
1997 deaths
People from the Bronx
20th-century American Jews
American people of Russian-Jewish descent
American people of Austrian-Jewish descent